The Ufa Arena is an 8,250-seat multi-purpose arena in Ufa, Russia that opened in 2007.  It has replaced Ice Palace Salavat Yulaev as the home of Kontinental Hockey League ice hockey team, Salavat Yulaev Ufa.

The first events in the arena were the first two games of the 2007 Super Series, a hockey series between Canada and Russia juniors. There were issues during the game in which fog was building up over the ice surface during the game, as the ice had been chilled but the air conditioning was not yet functional because the building was incomplete at the time.

The arena was the primary venue for the 2013 World Junior Ice Hockey Championships, which was played from the last week of December, 2012 until the first week of January, 2013.

External links
Arena information 
Arena picture

Sports_venues_in_Bashkortostan
Sports venues completed in 2007
Indoor ice hockey venues in Russia
Indoor arenas in Russia
Music venues in Russia
Salavat Yulaev Ufa
Arena
Kontinental Hockey League venues